Bombay Mail may refer to:
 Bombay Mail (1934 film), an American pre-Code drama film
 Bombay Mail (1935 film), a Hindi-language Indian film
 Imperial Indian Mail, a train from Bombay to Calcutta during the British Raj